Peter Kudryk (born c. 1948) was a Canadian football player who played for the Hamilton Tiger-Cats. He won the Grey Cup with them in 1972. He played junior football in Brantford, Ontario.

References

1940s births
Living people
Hamilton Tiger-Cats players
Canadian football defensive linemen